The Rapid Motor Vehicle Company was founded in 1902 in Pontiac, Michigan, by brothers Max (1874-1946) and Morris Grabowsky, whose earlier venture, Grabowsky Motor Company, had been founded in Detroit in 1900. They went on to build one-ton trucks and were the beginning of GMC Truck division after they were acquired by General Motors in 1909.

History

In 1905 Rapid built a new assembly plant at 25 Rapid Street abutting the Grand Trunk Western Railroad tracks on the south side of Pontiac, Michigan. The Rapid Street Plant 1 was the nucleus of what would become the Pontiac West Assembly complex.

Rapid was the "first truck to conquer Pikes Peak" in a 1909 road race.

General Motors Era

General Motors Company was founded by William C. Durant in 1908. Durant began acquiring the stock of Rapid Motor Vehicle Company in 1908 and in 1909 had a controlling interest. Rapid Motor Vehicle Company became a subsidiary of General Motors in 1909. In 1911 the Rapid Motor Vehicle Company ceased to exist when General Motors Truck Company was created and all of General Motors truck subsidiaries were absorbed in to the new business unit. In 1912 the Rapid brand name was discontinued in favor of GMC.

Advertisements

References

1900s cars
Motor vehicle manufacturers based in Michigan
Defunct motor vehicle manufacturers of the United States
Vehicle manufacturing companies established in 1902
1902 establishments in Michigan
Vehicle manufacturing companies disestablished in 1909
Veteran vehicles
GMC (automobile)
1909 disestablishments in Michigan
Defunct manufacturing companies based in Michigan
Defunct truck manufacturers of the United States